Silent Descent is a 5-track self-titled EP by English melodic death metal band Silent Descent. It was released on February 11, 2005. The EP was Silent Descent's first release and stylistically bears little resemblance to the group's later material.

Track listing

Personnel
 Tom Watling – lead vocals
 Tom Callahan – rhythm guitar, bass
 Nik King – lead guitar, bass
 Elliot Philpot – drums

References 

Silent Descent albums
2005 debut EPs